The 2023 FIS Nordic Junior World Ski Championships were held from 28 January to 5 February 2023 in Whistler, Canada.

Schedule
All times are local (UTC–8).

Cross-country

Nordic combined

Ski jumping

Medal summary

Junior events

Cross-country skiing

Nordic combined

Ski jumping

U23 events

Cross-country skiing

Medal tables

All events

Junior events

Under-23 events

References

External links
Official website

2022
Junior World
Junior World
Junior World
2023 in Canadian sports
Nordic Junior World Ski Championships
Cross-country skiing competitions in Canada
Ski jumping competitions in Canada
Nordic combined competitions in Canada
Sports competitions in British Columbia
January 2023 sports events in Canada
February 2023 sports events in Canada